Biomass is an Earth observing satellite planned for launch by the European Space Agency (ESA) in 2024 on a Vega launch vehicle.

The mission will provide the first comprehensive measurements of global forest biomass. The mission is meant to last for five years, monitoring at least eight growth cycles in the worlds’ forests.

Background 
First announced in May 2013, when it was selected as ESA's seventh Earth Explorer, the Biomass satellite is part of ESA's Living Planet Programme, which consists of Earth observation missions. Its initial launch date was set to 2020, but that has since been delayed to 2024. The entire cost of the mission was placed at around 400 million euros. The main scientific instrument aboard Biomass will be a synthetic aperture radar (SAR) operating at 435 MHz. The satellite will measure 10 x 12 x 20m, weight around 1.2 tonnes and it is set to orbit the Earth at an altitude of 600 km.

The Biomass mission is planned to continue its observation of Earth for five years after launch, during which it will provide detailed information about at least eight growth cycles in the world's forests.

In 2016, it was announced that Airbus Defence and Space UK will build the satellite under a contract valued at 229 million euros. Biomass will be equipped with a large 12-m deployable antenna, which will be built in Friedrichshafen, Germany. The instruments of the antennas are being fabricated by Italy and France through Thales Alenia Space. All devices for assembly of the satellite structure, including vertical transport equipment, assembly and disassembly of satellite panels, assembly and disassembly of the Synthetic Aperture Radar will be done by the Spanish company SENER.

Scientific objectives 
The main objective of the mission is to measure forest biomass in order to assess terrestrial carbon stocks and fluxes and better understand the planet's carbon cycle. The Biomass mission will explore Earth's surface at the P-band wavelength, the first time this technique is used from orbit. This will allow it to provide accurate maps of tropical, temperate and boreal forest biomass that are not obtainable by ground measurement techniques. The amount of biomass and forest height will be measured at a resolution of 200 m, and forest disturbances such as clear-cutting at a resolution of 50 m.

Its stated objectives are:

 Reduce the large uncertainties in the carbon flux due to changes in land use
 Provide scientific support for international treaties, agreements and programs such as the UN’s REDD (Reducing Emissions from Deforestation and Forest Degradation in Developing Countries) program
 Improve understanding and predictions of landscape-scale carbon dynamics
 Provide observations to initialize and test the land element of Earth system models
 Provide key information for forest resources management and ecosystem services.

It is expected that the data sent back from the satellite will also contribute new information to other areas of climate science, like measuring the biomass of desert regions to find fossil water and new water sources in arid regions as well as contributing to observations of ice sheet dynamics, subsurface geology and forest topography.

See also
 ESA's Living Planet Programme
 GOCE
 SMOS
 CryoSat & CryoSat-2
 Swarm
 ADM-Aeolus
 EarthCARE
 FLEX

References

External links 
 ESA Biomass homepage on Earth Online

2024 in spaceflight
European Space Agency satellites
Earth observation satellites of the European Space Agency
Synthetic aperture radar satellites